Douglas or Doug Fisher may refer to:

Politics
 Douglas Glenn Fisher (born 1942), Canadian politician and farmer
 Douglas H. Fisher (born 1947), American politician
 Doug Fisher (politician) (1919–2009), Canadian politician and columnist

Others
 Douglas Fisher (Royal Navy officer) (1890–1963), British sailor and Fourth Sea Lord
 Douglas Fisher (born 1934), American actor, in Imagination Movers
 Douglas John Fisher, American bishop
 Doug Fisher (actor) (1941–2000), British actor
 Doug Fisher (American football) (1947–2023), American football player